The 1974 Trans-Am Series was the ninth running of the Sports Car Club of America's premier series. It began on May 4 and ran for only three rounds, including the Six Hours of Watkins Glen.

Results

Championships

Driver

Over Two Liter
Peter Gregg – 60 points
Ludwig Heimrath –  53 points
Hurley Haywood – 50 points
Al Holbert – 32 points
Jim Cook – 30 points

Under Two Liter
Richard Weiss – 35 points
Seig Glage – 22 points
John Stevens – 20 points
Harold Keck – 20 points
Tim Meehan – 15 points

Manufacturer
Porsche – 36 points
Camaro – 14 points
BMW – 3 points
AMC Javelin – 1 point

References

Trans-Am Series
Trans-Am